Chapman is an unincorporated community in Coal Township, Jackson County, Ohio, United States.

The post office was originally established as the Ennis Post Office on January 2, 1883.  The name was changed to Chapman Post Office on September 5, 1888, and ultimately discontinued on November 15, 1915.  Mail service is now handled by the Coalton branch.

References 

Unincorporated communities in Jackson County, Ohio